Bolognola is a comune (municipality) in the Province of Macerata in the Italian region Marche, located about  southwest of Ancona and about  southwest of Macerata.

Bolognola borders the following municipalities: Fiastra, Montefortino, Sarnano, Ussita.

Main sights
The town is home to the church of San Michele Arcangelo.

References

Cities and towns in the Marche